Limay is a commune in the Yvelines department in the Île-de-France region in north-central France. It is located in the western suburbs of Paris  from the center.

Limay lies across the Seine river from Mantes-la-Jolie.

Population

People
Composer Ernest Chausson owned an estate in Limay, and it was here that he died in a bicycle accident on his property.

Transportation
Limay is served by Limay station on the Transilien Paris – Saint-Lazare suburban rail line.

See also
Communes of the Yvelines department

References

Communes of Yvelines